Cyrtodactylus nebulosus, also known as the clouded Indian gecko, is a species of gecko found in India.

Description
Note that the following diagnostic description may include Cyrtodactylus collegalensis following an older taxonomy.
Head rather large, oviform, generally very convex, sometimes more depressed; snout longer than the diameter of the orbit or the distance between the eye and the ear-opening; forehead slightly concave; ear-opening elliptical, oblique, one third to one halt the diameter of the eye. Body rather short, not much depressed. Limbs moderate; digits short, thick, slightly depressed at the base, compressed at the end, beneath with enlarged plates. Head covered with granules, which are larger on the snout; rostral quadrangular, generally nearly twice as broad as deep; nostril pierced between the rostral, the first labial, and several small scales; 9 to 11 upper and 7 to 9 lower labials; mental triangular; a pair of large chin-shields forming a suture behind the point of the mental, surrounded by several smaller shields. Upper surface of body covered with small granules, which are uniform or intermixed with more or less numerous, irregularly scattered, small roundish keeled tubercles.   Abdominal scales small, cycloid, imbricate, smooth.    No femoral or pre-anal pores. Tail cylindrical, tapering, probably prehensile, covered with small imbricate smooth scales, largest below. Pale brownish above, variously ornamented with brown spots or cross bands becoming blackish towards their borders and more or less distinctly finely margined with lighter; head marbled or elegantly marked with insuliform brown spots, with a brown band passing through the eye; lower surfaces whitish, the throat reticulated with brown, which reticulation has a tendency to form oblique lines. From snout to vent 2 inches: tail 1.7.

The distribution of this species appears to be Central and eastern India.

Notes

References
 Annandale, N (1913) The Indian geckos of the genus Gymnodactylus. Rec. Ind. Mus. 9:309–326
 Beddome, R. H. (1870). Descriptions of new reptiles from the Madras Presidency. Madras Monthly J. Med. Sci., 2: 169–176 [Reprint.: J. Soc. Bibliogr. Nat. Sci., London, 1 (10): 327–334, 1940]
 Dutta, S K (1997) A record of Geckoella nebulosus (Beddome, 1870) from Orissa. Hamadryad 22(1):49–50
 Underwood, Garth (1954). On the classification and evolution of geckos. Proc. Zool. Soc. London, 124 (3): 469–492.

External links
 

Cyrtodactylus
Reptiles described in 1870